Bujoreni is a commune located in Vâlcea County, Oltenia, Romania, just to the north of Râmnicu Vâlcea, the seat of Vâlcea County. It is composed of seven villages: Bogdănești, Bujoreni, Gura Văii, Lunca, Malu Alb, Malu Vârtop and Olteni (the commune centre).

Agriculture is the main income source. There are special traditions which have been well preserved.

Geography

Bujoreni stretches along the European Route E81 (DN 7) (Bucharest - Râmnicu Vâlcea - Sibiu), on the right bank of the River Olt.

Natives

Valeriu Sârbu (born 1931), poet, playwright

References

External links
 http://primariabujoreni.ro/
 http://www.muzee-valcea.ro
 http://www.valceaturistica.ro

Communes in Vâlcea County
Localities in Oltenia